This is a list of events in Scottish television from 2020.

Events

January to June
No events.

July
31 July – Steve Carson named as new director of BBC Scotland, to replace Donalda MacKinnon later in the year.

August
25 August – Filming recommences on BBC Scotland's soap River City after it was suspended because of the COVID-19 pandemic.

September
No events.

October
19 October – Steve Carson starts as director of BBC Scotland. Around twenty staff departures, including some long-serving correspondents, are announced, as attempts are made to reduce the budget of the organisation by around £6.2 million by April.

November
4 November – Amazon announces that its supernatural thriller series The Rig is to be filmed in Scotland.
7 November – Sky Sports announces that the Scotland and Northern Ireland Euro 2020 play-off finals will be made free-to-air on UK television.

December
1 December – BBC Scotland announces that Susan Calman will front their Hogmanay Live programme for a second time, with Deacon Blue, Amy Macdonald and Blazin' Fiddles. Jackie Bird is to host an hour-long programme celebrating Scotland's heroes of the coronavirus pandemic.
19 December – Nicola Walker will take on the role of DI Annika Strandhed in a UKTV drama series around murders that are discovered in the waterways of Scotland.
27 December – Details of the cast for BBC Scotland's Hogmanay programme for 2020, are released.
31 December – Hogmanay Live with Susan Calman sees in the New Year; overnight viewing figures indicate it is watched by 1.05 million viewers.

Debuts

BBC
The Scotts, Group and the Daly Grind.

Ongoing television programmes

1960s
Reporting Scotland (1968–1983; 1984–present)

1970s
Sportscene (1975–present)
Landward (1976–present)
The Beechgrove Garden (1978–present)

1990s
Eòrpa (1993–present)

2000s
River City (2002–present)
The Adventure Show (2005–present)
An Là (2008–present)
Trusadh (2008–present)
STV Rugby (2009–2010; 2011–present)
STV News at Six (2009–present)

2010s
Scotland Tonight (2011–present)
Shetland (2013–present)
Scot Squad (2014–present)
Two Doors Down (2016–present)
Molly and Mack (2018–2022)
The Nine (2019–present)
Debate Night (2019–present)
A View from the Terrace (2019–present)

Ending this year
Only an Excuse? (1993–2020)

Deaths
9 July – Johnny Beattie, actor (born 1926)
15 July – Maurice Roëves, actor (born 1937)

See also
2020 in Scotland

References

 
Television in Scotland by year
2020s in Scottish television